Chenab West Bank railway station is  located at west bank of river Chenab at Muzaffargarh to Multan road,  Pakistan.

See also
 List of railway stations in Pakistan
 Pakistan Railways

References

External links

Muzaffargarh
Transport in Muzaffargarh
Railway stations in Muzaffargarh District
Railway stations on Sher Shah–Kot Addu Branch Line
Buildings and structures in Muzaffargarh